The 1990–91 ACB season was the 8th season of the Liga ACB, after changing its name. The competition format changed again. The 24 teams were divided in two groups of 12 teams each. The eight first teams of each group advanced to the championship playoffs, and the four last teams of each group advanced to the relegation playoffs.

Montigalà Joventut won their first ACB title, and their 3rd overall. It was the first ACB title won by a team besides FC Barcelona and Real Madrid.

Team Standings

Regular season

Group Even

Group Odd

Playoffs

Relegation Playoffs

Cajabilbao and Cajacanarias were relegated.

Championship Playoffs

External links
 ACB.com 
 linguasport.com 

 
Liga ACB seasons